A total solar eclipse occurred on Sunday, February 9, 1766. A solar eclipse occurs when the Moon passes between Earth and the Sun, thereby totally or partly obscuring the image of the Sun for a viewer on Earth. A total solar eclipse occurs when the Moon's apparent diameter is larger than the Sun's, blocking all direct sunlight, turning day into darkness. Totality occurs in a narrow path across Earth's surface, with the partial solar eclipse visible over a surrounding region thousands of kilometres wide.

Observations

Related eclipses 
It is a part of solar Saros 117.

References

 
 NASA chart graphics
 Googlemap
 NASA Besselian elements

1766 2 9
1766 in science
1766 2 9